Agladrillia rhodochroa is a species of sea snail, a marine gastropod mollusk in the family Drilliidae.

Description
The length of the shell varies between 8 mm and 25 mm.

(Original description - in French) The solid shell has a polished appearance. It has a flesh color or is pinkish while the acute, turriculated shell contains 10 slightly convex whorls, separated by an oppressed suture. The protoconch contains two smooth and papillary whorls. The whorls of the teleoconch show oblique, strong, longitudinal ribs. These ribs have about the same width as their interspaces. These interspaces are ornated with decurrent, regularly separated furrows and slightly visible growth lines. The dorsal region of the body whorl only shows these furrows and growth lines. It is limited by the edge of the lip on one side and on the other side by a last longitudinal, variciform rib. The oval aperture ends up in a short, open siphonal canal. The columella is almost straight and shows a thick callus. The sharp outer lip is on top provided with a very deep sinus.

Distribution
This species occurs in the Caribbean Sea off Colombia.

References

  Fallon P.J. (2016). Taxonomic review of tropical western Atlantic shallow water Drilliidae (Mollusca: Gastropoda: Conoidea) including descriptions of 100 new species. Zootaxa. 4090(1): 1–363

External links
 

rhodochroa
Gastropods described in 1900